Artyom Vladimirovich Lukoyanov (born 31 January 1989) is a Russian professional ice hockey forward who is currently playing with Ak Bars Kazan in the Kontinental Hockey League (KHL).

Lukoyanov played with Ak Bars during the 2012–13 season.

Awards and honours

Football appearance
On 17 April 2019, third-tier Russian Professional Football League club FC KAMAZ Naberezhnye Chelny announced the signing of Lukoyanov as a football player. On 21 April 2019, he made his professional football debut in a game against FC Ufa-2, coming on as a substitute for David Karayev in the 86th minute of the game and KAMAZ up 2–0. He returned to hockey after the game, even though he remained on KAMAZ's roster until the end of the 2018–19 season.

References

External links

1989 births
Living people
People from Almetyevsk
Ak Bars Kazan players
Russian ice hockey forwards
Russian footballers
FC KAMAZ Naberezhnye Chelny players
Russian Second League players
Association football forwards
Sportspeople from Tatarstan